Namdar-e Bala (also Romanized as Nāmdar-e Bālā; also known as Nāndar-e Bālā) is a village in Siyahu Rural District, Fin District, Bandar Abbas County, Hormozgan Province, Iran. At the 2006 census, its population was 120, in 33 families.

References 

Populated places in Bandar Abbas County